Le Wast is a commune in the Pas-de-Calais department in the Hauts-de-France region of France.

Geography

Population

Places of interest
 The eleventh century church of St.Michel.
 A chateau, dating from the eighteenth century.

See also
Communes of the Pas-de-Calais department

References

Wast
Pas-de-Calais communes articles needing translation from French Wikipedia